Qatrania is an extinct genus of primates. There are two known species.

Species
†Qatrania fleaglei  Simons & Kay, 1988
†Qatrania wingi  Simons & Kay, 1983

References 

Prehistoric primate genera
Fossil taxa described in 1983